MSC Maya is one of the world's largest container ships, built in 2015. The cargo ship has capacity for 19,224 TEU.

Design 
MSC Maya was built in 2015 in Daewoo Shipbuilding & Marine Engineering by yard number 4280. With such dimensions, the vessel has capacity to carry 19,224 TEU.

Engine equipment 
The main engine on board of MSC Maya is 2-stroke 11-cylinder diesel engine MAN B&W 11S90ME-C10, which has total output power of 67,100 kW / 83,780 hp. The vessel is driven by one fixed-pitch five-blades propeller with a diameter of 10.5 m (34.5 ft). Additionally, for easier maneuvering while at port, the ultra large container carrier is equipped with two bow thrusters.

MSC Maya News and Information 
MSC Maya was christened in Port of Antwerp on September 26, 2016.

MSC Maya made her maiden call at Southampton on December 15, 2016.

MSC Maya is operating under the flag of Panama with IMO number 9708679 and call sign 3EZI. The vessel is operating on Far East-Europe service of MSC in the framework of the 2M Alliance.
MSC Maya is known, as the largest container ship, which ever visited Poland

Sister Ships 
 MSC Zoe
 MSC Oliver
 MSC Oscar
 Largest container shipping companies
 Largest container ships ever built

References

External links
MSC Maya
MSC Maya principle particulars

Container ships
Merchant ships of Panama
2015 ships
Ships built by Daewoo Shipbuilding & Marine Engineering